Barry Blue (born Barry Ian Green, 4 December 1950) is an English singer, producer, and songwriter.  As an artist, he is best known for his hit songs "Dancin' (on a Saturday Night)" and "Do You Wanna Dance" (both 1973).

Blue has also been a prolific songwriter and producer for many artists, and has had over forty worldwide hits, including Andrea Bocelli, Diana Ross, Celine Dion, The Saturdays, The Wanted, and Pixie Lott.  In film and television, Blue has provided soundtracks and/or themes for productions including Eyes of Laura Mars, Long Good Friday, and Escape to Athena.

Early days
At the age of 13, Barry Blue made his first television appearance with his school band The Dark Knights, performing on Stubby Kaye's Silver Star Show, a weekly children's talent show hosted by Kaye via Granada TV.  By the age of 14, Blue had signed with record producer Norrie Paramor, whose assistant was Tim Rice; the producer of Blue's first song Rainmaker Girl, which became a hit for Gene Pitney in the United States.  Later he became a bassist in the line-up of Spice; the band featured Mick Box and David Byron, and was the precursor to the heavy rock band Uriah Heep. He followed this in 1966 with a two-year period in A&R at the Bee Gees' publishing company Abigail Music, under direction of their manager Robert Stigwood.

In 1970, Blue signed as a songwriter to ATV-Kirshner located in Bruton Street, London, where he joined a group of professional songwriters that included Lynsey de Paul and Ron Roker.  One of their earliest songs was Sugarloaf Hill, recorded by the reggae artist, Del Davis.  Other early career notable songs co-written by Blue and de Paul include Tip of My Tongue for the British group Brotherly Love, as well as female vocal trio Ellie, and House of Cards recorded by a number of artists including John Christie, Australian artist Rob Guest, and the D.J. Tony Blackburn.  Another from this period included Crossword Puzzle, also co-written with de Paul, and which led to an appearance on Top of the Pops for Irish singer Dana.  At the time, he was still using his real surname of Green.

Blue wrote his first UK Singles Chart hit back in 1972 with de Paul, titled Sugar Me.  The song originally was written for Peter Noone, but de Paul's boyfriend at the time, Dudley Moore, suggested that she should take a demo version to manager Gordon Mills, who told her she should record it herself.  The song also charted in singles charts in the Netherlands, Spain, and Belgium.  Sugar Me was also covered in the US by Nancy Sinatra and Claudine Longet.

Career
He released his first record in June 1971, under his real name of Barry Green, on the Ember label titled 'Together', written by Jean-Pierre Mirouze, taken from the French film Le mariage collectif. He signed to Decca Records, and released four singles between 1971 and 1974. Including Papa Do, which was released by Barry Green as a single. In a 2020 interview, he revealed that he decided to adopt Blue as a stage name after speaking with a record company employee who told him that green is considered an unlucky colour by circus performers, and because all the three singles released as Barry Green had been "quite unsuccessful", he eventually decided to be known as Barry Blue instead of Barry Green.

His first UK chart success came with a change of name, and record deal with Bell Records in 1973, billed as Barry Blue, and had five hit singles, Dancin' (On A Saturday Night) (no. 2, 1973) (co-written with de Paul), Do You Wanna Dance? (no. 7, 1973), School Love (no. 11, 1974), Miss Hit and Run (no. 26, 1974). His final Top 40 hit in the UK Singles Chart occurred in October 1974, when Hot Shot, another song co-written with de Paul, climbed to number 23, and number 3 in Zimbabwe. Blue returned to the UK charts in 1989 with a remix version of Dancin' (On A Saturday Night). Throughout 1973–74, Blue appeared on many major TV shows and tours alongside artists such as Queen, ABBA, and Status Quo.

Blue achieved a million seller in 1975 with Kiss Me Kiss Your Baby, recorded by Brotherhood of Man.  Two years later (1977), he co-wrote Devil's Gun, a song by C. J. & Company from the album of the same name.  The song went to number 1 for five weeks on the Billboard disco/dance chart.  The single also peaked at number 36 on the Billboard Hot 100, and number 2 on the R&B chart.[2] Written by Blue, Ron Roker, and Gerry Shury, and produced by Mike Theodore and Dennis Coffey.  The song is notable for being the first record played at the opening of Studio 54 on 26 April 1977 by DJ Richie Kaczor.[3] The instrumental portions of Devil's Gun were featured prominently in the international version of the film Crocodile.  It also featured in the film The Real Bruce Lee.  In 2016, the song was included in The Get Down soundtrack, and the following year it was featured in the film Borg vs McEnroe.

One of his major production successes was the multi-racial, Anglo-US funk/soul band Heatwave, who enjoyed hits in the UK and US with Boogie Nights, Always and Forever, Mind Blowing Decisions, and The Groove Line. Other funk songs produced by Blue include Funk Theory, by Rokotto in 1978 reached number 49, Somebody Help Me Out by Beggar and Co which reached number 15 in the UK in 1981, and Say Yeah by The Limit which peaked at number 17 on the UK Singles Chart and number 7 on the U.S. Billboard Dance/Club Play chart in 1985.  In 1989, under the banner of Cry Sisco!, Blue had another minor hit with a song called Afro Dizzi Act, which reached number 42 on the UK Singles Chart.

Selected songs for other artists

Chart hits as a songwriter
Sugar Me for Lynsey de Paul (1972) – a worldwide million seller
Tip of My Tongue for Brotherly Love (1973)
Dancin' (on a Saturday Night) for Barry Blue (1973)
Do You Wanna Dance for Barry Blue (1973)
School Love for Barry Blue (1974)
Miss Hit and Run for Barry Blue (1974)
Hot Shot for Barry Blue (1974)
Ooh I Do for Lynsey de Paul (1974)
Dancin' (On A Saturday Night) for Flash Cadillac & Continental Kids (1974)
Kiss Me Kiss Your Baby for Brotherhood of Man (a European million seller) (1975)
Devil's Gun for C. J. & Company (1977)
Funk Theory for Rokotto (1978)
One More Minute for Saint Tropez (USA chart hit, plus number 9 Dance chart) (1979)
And I Wish for The Dooleys (1979)
I Eat Cannibals Part 1 for Toto Coelo (1982)
Dracula's Tango (Sucker For Your Love) for Toto Coelo (1982)
All Fall Down for Five Star (1985)
Dancin' (On A Saturday Night) (reissue) for Barry Blue (1989)
Escaping for Asia Blue (1992)
Escaping for Margaret Urlich (1989)
Beautiful Life for Lydia Canaan (1995)
Escaping for Dina Carroll (1996)
Je Compte Jusqu'à Toi for Patricia Kaas (1997)

Chart hits as a producer
Fairytale for Dana (1976)
Boogie Nights for Heatwave (1977)
Have I The Right for Dead End Kids (1977)
Too Hot To Handle / Slip Your Disc To This for Heatwave (1977)
The Groove Line for Heatwave (1977)
Mind Blowing Decisions for Heatwave (1978)
Always And Forever for Heatwave (1978)
Something's Cooking in the Kitchen for Dana (1979)
I've Got Faith in You for Cheryl Lynn (USA R&B hit) (1980)
(Somebody) Help Me Out for Beggar and Co (1981)
Cheers Then for Bananarama (1982)
Say Yeah for Limit (ft. Gwen Guthrie) (1985)
Mony Mony for Amazulu (1987)
Afro Dizzi Act for Cry Sisco! (1989)

Film, television and advertising

Blue has provided soundtracks and / or themes for various productions:

Discography

Albums

Studio albums

Compilation albums

EPs

Singles

Honours, awards, and achievements
1965: Silver Star (Stubby Kaye’s talent show)
1973: Carl Allan Award – Record of The Year (Dancing’ On A Saturday Night)
1977: 6 BMI / ASCAP Awards (Heatwave USA)
1977: Councillor – BASCA
1977: Music Week – Market Survey Top Record Producer
1986: Founded Aosis Studios in London
1989: Founded The Escape Artist Company
1995: Founded Connect 2 Music
2007: Founded Plan 8 Music
2010: Director, PRS for Music Ltd (2010–2019)
2014: Director, Karma Songs

References

External links

Barry Blue on Myspace

FavoredNationsMusic.com
Barry Blue interview with M Magazine

1950 births
Living people
English male singers
English songwriters
English record producers
Glam rock musicians
Singers from London
British male songwriters